Lee Jae-woong(Korean:이재웅) (born 17 March 1996) is a South Korean sledge hockey player. He was a member of South Korea's bronze medal winning team in para ice hockey at the 2018 Winter Paralympics. Lee is the team goalie and has cerebral palsy.

References

External links 
 

1996 births
Living people
South Korean sledge hockey players
Paralympic sledge hockey players of South Korea
Paralympic bronze medalists for South Korea
Para ice hockey players at the 2018 Winter Paralympics
Para ice hockey players at the 2022 Winter Paralympics
Medalists at the 2018 Winter Paralympics
Sportspeople with cerebral palsy
Paralympic medalists in sledge hockey